Anthony John Attwood (born 9 February 1952) is a British psychologist notable for his work on Asperger syndrome. He resides in Queensland, Australia, where he is an Associate Professor at Griffith University.

Education
He received an honours degree in psychology from the University of Hull, an M.A. in clinical psychology from the University of Surrey and a Ph.D. from University College London supervised by Uta Frith.

Research and career
His books include Asperger's Syndrome: A Guide for Parents and Professionals, which has been translated into 20 languages and provides information on diagnosis, problems of social relations, sensory issues, motor control and other typical issues which face people with Asperger's and their support networks. His other books include The Complete Guide to Aspergers Syndrome, Exploring Feelings for Young Children with High-Functioning Autism or Aspergers Disorder, and From Like to Love for Young People with Aspergers Syndrome (Autism Spectrum Disorder): Learning How to Express and Enjoy Affection with Family and Friends.

Attwood has a clinical practice at his diagnostic and treatment clinic for children and adults with Asperger's Syndrome, in Brisbane, begun in 1992.

Attwood expressed support for facilitated communication in Lucy's Story: Autism and Other Adventures.

It took Attwood thirty years to notice that his own son, Will Attwood, was autistic. Will became addicted to drugs in the meantime and ended up in jail. He later wrote a book on his experience, Asperger’s Syndrome and Jail.

Books
 
 
 
 
 
 
 Attwood, Tony. "Exploring Feelings DVD Cognitive Behaviour Therapy to Manage Anxiety, Sadness, and Anger"

Selected papers
 Sofronoff K, Attwood T, Hinton S, Levin I. "A Randomized Controlled Trial of a Cognitive Behavioural Intervention for Anger Management in Children Diagnosed with Asperger Syndrome." Autism Dev Disord. 2006 Nov 3. 
 Sofronoff K, Attwood T, Hinton S. "A randomised controlled trial of a CBT intervention for anxiety in children with Asperger syndrome. J Child Psychol Psychiatry. 2005 Nov;46(11):1152-60. 
 Attwood T. "Frameworks for behavioral interventions." Child Adolesc Psychiatr Clin N Am. 2003 Jan;12(1):65-86.   (A review article)
 Foreword and Afterword for Lucy Blackman's autobiographic account Lucy's Story: Autism and Other Adventures (2001)
 Foreword for Robin and the White Rabbit by Åse Brunnström and Emma Lindström .

Other works
Some of Attwood's books are mentioned in the game To the Moon.

Controversy
In 2019, Karla Fisher, another autism advocate, said many of Attwood's jokes about autism were a mockery of autistic people. Other autism advocates also claimed that many of Attwood's descriptions of autistic people in his lectures are based on false stereotypes and claimed he makes sweeping generalisations that are not based on evidence. In May 2019, there was a protest in Sheffield which was critical of his views.

Further, he continually refers to "the Aspie" despite this being discouraged by the National Autistic Society due to the Nazi links with Hans Asperger.

References

1952 births
Alumni of the University of Hull
Alumni of the University of Surrey
Alumni of the University of London
Autism researchers
English medical writers
English psychologists
Living people
People from Birmingham, West Midlands
People from Queensland
Australian psychologists